St. Xavier's Institute of Education is an English-medium, teacher-training college in Mumbai, India, founded in 1953 by the Society of Jesus (Jesuits) in the Catholic church. As a government-subsidized, Minority Institution, it admits 50% Christian Minority students. Recently, the college got Autonomous status by University Grant Commission

History
St. Xavier's Institute of Education was first located at St. Xavier's College, Mumbai, and is the oldest aided, non-government, teacher-training college for the course of B.Ed. It is affiliated to the University of Mumbai and recognized by the National Council for Teacher Education (NCTE). The Bachelor course requires two years and includes an internship programme. From 1955 to 1977 the Institute offered also a Diploma in Education.

In 2014, the teaching staff stood at 8, and its student body at 87 women and 11 men.

See also
 List of Jesuit sites

References  

Universities and colleges in Mumbai
Colleges of education in India
Jesuit universities and colleges in India
Educational institutions established in 1953
Affiliates of the University of Mumbai
1953 establishments in Bombay State